Nils Aage Jegstad (born 12 December 1950) is a Norwegian politician for the Conservative Party.

He served as a deputy representative to the Norwegian Parliament from Akershus during the term 2005–2009.

On the local level, he was first elected to Vestby municipality council in 1976, and served as mayor from 1987 to 1999. In 1995 he was elected for the first time to the county council. Following the 2007 elections, Jegstad became the new county mayor (fylkesordfører) of Akershus.

References

1950 births
Living people
Deputy members of the Storting
Conservative Party (Norway) politicians
Mayors of places in Akershus
Chairmen of County Councils of Norway
21st-century Norwegian politicians